The 2019 EuroEyes Cyclassics was a road cycling one-day race that took place on 25 August 2019 in Germany. It was the 24th edition of EuroEyes Cyclassics and the 33rd event of the 2019 UCI World Tour. It was won for the third year in a row by Elia Viviani in the sprint.

Teams
Twenty teams of up to seven riders will be participating in the race:

UCI WorldTeams

 
 
 
 
 
 
 
 
 
 
 
 
 
 
 
 
 
 

UCI Professional Continental teams

Result

References

EuroEyes Cyclassics
EuroEyes Cyclassics
EuroEyes Cyclassics
EuroEyes Cyclassics